Scott Sunken Garden is a historical landmark in Lansing, Michigan, United States of America.

The outer foundation walls are 51 feet by 79 feet and the center is a  feet by 45 feet lawn. There are shorter limestone walls lining the court with raised flower beds. The west side and east sides have limestone steps leading to a small water pond below the grotto center piece. This foundation of Justice Edward Cahill's home was redesigned after 1930 by a new American immigrant, Nick Kriek. The gardening includes bulbs, annuals, perennials and a list of species introduced to the area by Kriek himself.
The garden has been maintained by the Greater Lansing Garden Club for three decades; they restored it after a few decades of neglect by the city.

The Scott Sunken Garden landmark has a list of historically significant ties including 1930's "Golden Age of American Landscaping", Immigration, Civil Rights, and Lansing's Beautification.

Recognition
National Register Coordinator for the State of Michigan state that the Scott Sunken Garden Is eligible for listing in the National Register of Historic Places.... The garden appears to meet national register criteria B and C...."

History
"Even though the Scott House  itself – the house  that stood just west of the garden near the Jenison House/Scott Center –  that formed the central feature of the property no longer exists, the  garden stands out as a fine example of formal landscape garden design  from the early twentieth century (various dates  of construction from the mid-1920s to 1934-35 have been reported). As  far as I’ve been able to determine from all the recent discussions, the  garden is unique in Lansing as a formal garden that, designed for an  urban residential setting, dates from the early  twentieth century period when landscaped gardens and estates associated  with them reached a height of design perfection, during what has been  called the “Golden Age of American Landscape Design.” The Scott Sunken  Garden, in my mind, possesses additional significance  as a prime achievement of a local Lansing artisan, Nick or Nicolaas  Isaac Willem Kriek. Kriek (1895–1978) was born in the Netherlands and, settling in Lansing in the early 1920s, founded the Cottage Gardens  nursery in 1923. Bill Hicks, Mr. Kriek's grandson  and today part of the still operating family-owned business, states  that Nick Kriek built the Sunken Garden for Scott, from whom he had  purchased the property on which the Cottage Gardens nursery was  established in 1923. It seems logical to think that Kriek  had a major hand in designing the garden to meet the Scotts’ wishes and  requirements. The garden also possesses importance for its direct association with an important Lansing citizen, Richard H. Scott, who owned the property and had the garden created. Marilyn  Lee's 2010 history of the garden states that Scott came to Lansing in 1898 to work for auto pioneer R. E. Olds and helped organize Olds’ Reo  Motor Car Company and served as president of the company after Olds  retired in 1923."

This Scott Sunken Garden foundation is presumed to be the remains of Justice Edward Cahill's Lansing home. He moved to Lansing after serving in the Civil War and went to war serving beside African American soldiers in Michigan's 102nd USCI on a campaign through southern states. Justice Edward Cahill served in the Michigan Supreme Court in 1890. Justice Cahill also concurred upholding Racial equality in USA's landmark Civil Right's "William W. Ferguson vs. Edward G. Gies" case 

The local chapter of this national garden club has a long history with both the Scott Sunken Garden and the Scott Center. The club met at the Scott Center before it was moved to Scott Park and the Garden Club invested the financing to restoration of the garden through the early 1980s. The city fell short of original expectations and the Garden Club paid for a restoration of the lower wall of the Scott Sunken Garden

Politics

The city is in need of widespread upgrades to the power grid infrastructure inducing several substations to replace the older Eckert Substation next to the Eckert Power Station. The Lansing Board of Water and Light (LBWL) and Mayor Virg Bernero have pushed for a large central substation with their proposal to destroy a riverside park (Scott Park) and to remove historical integrity of its historical landmark of Scott Sunken Garden.

LBWL proposals
The LBWL had submitted an original proposal to the Lansing Parks and Recreation then amended it during the review by the Lansing Planning Board. These boards are appointed by the mayor and their decisions are being reviewed by the Lansing City Council.

Parkland advocacy
The Scott Sunken Garden caretakers of three decades, the Greater Lansing Garden Club, have declined the LBWL offer of the new garden, wanting the historical garden to remain intact. Each public board meeting and the public meeting held by Jessica Yorko (as Lansing City Council, 4th Ward Representative) were occupied with citizen advocates. There are multiple community organizations publicly advocating saving Scott Sunken Garden, and its Scott Park; "Preservation Lansing" has advocated this along with a list of other historical concerns in the area; Friends of Scott Sunken Garden Park" is a non-profit advocacy organization instituted for protecting Scott Sunken Garden and its neighboring assets of the people of Lansing.

Public petitions
Original petition for Lansing Parks and Recreation: "Save Scott Park and the Sunken Garden"

Request for more ideal alternative and assistance with concerns by officials: "Two Downtown Lansing Substations Audit and Investigation into Concerns by Mayor and LBW"

See also
 American Civil War
 Immigration
 List of National Historic Landmarks in Michigan

References

Civil liberties in the United States
Egalitarianism
Buildings and structures in Lansing, Michigan